Anghami is the first legal music streaming platform and digital distribution company in the Arab world. It launched in November 2011 in Lebanon, providing unlimited Arabic and international music to stream and download for offline mode. It is designed for the Middle East and North Africa to provide the largest music catalog of licensed content from the major Arabic labels such as Melody, Mazzika, Platinum Records and many other independent labels, in addition to international majors labels such as  Sony, Universal and Warner Music Group. Anghami is one of the largest digital music ventures in the Middle East, seed funded by MEVP.

History 

The goal of Anghami was to reduce music piracy in the Arab world. The service was meant to serve as an alternative to piracy.

Anghami was founded by Eddy Maroun, and Elie Habib in Lebanon, launched initially as a mobile only app with the slogan "The idea is that everywhere you go, you’ll find your music". One of Anghami's app features is Dolby Pulse encoding, which reduces the file size of streamed music for faster and reliable online streaming when the internet bandwidth is fluctuating. Anghami has more than 35  telecom partners.

Shortly after the partnership between Anghami and mobile operators in MENA has been agreed few months after launching, the service experienced rapid growth with 1 million registered users four months after the launch.  However, the next million was reached in three months, mainly after partnering with the major media player MBC Group Middle East Broadcasting Center that featured Anghami in one of its most successful TV shows Arab Idol. In 2013, Anghami partnered with Facebook.

By 2017, Anghami reached 30 million listeners, with 75% of users being in the Arab region. In 2019, Anghami's founder revealed in an interview that Anghami has 21 million monthly active users and 1 million paying subscribers.

In March 2021, Anghami became the first Arabic technology company to list on New York’s Nasdaq through a Special Purpose Acquisition Company (SPAC) merger with Vistas Media Acquisition Company and the company was valued at between $220 million and $230 million.

In August 2021, Anghami announced plans to launch a new hybrid entertainment venue named the Anghami Lab in multiple cities worldwide, including Dubai, Riyadh, Jeddah, Cairo, Beirut, London, New York and Los Angeles.

See also
 List of on-demand streaming music services

References

External links
 Official website

Middle Eastern music
Music streaming services
North African music
2012 establishments in Lebanon
2012 software
Android (operating system) software
IOS software
Windows Phone software
Online music stores of Lebanon
Symbian software
Jukebox-style media players
Mass media companies established in 2012
Lebanese brands
Companies listed on the Nasdaq
Special-purpose acquisition companies